Lynton is a suburb in the southern foothills hills of Adelaide, South Australia.  A leafy suburb, it was established during the settlement of Adelaide as a source of timber. The nearby Windy Point lookout (formerly known as Observation Point) represents one of the best lookouts over the city and suburbs.

References

Suburbs of Adelaide